Dr. Brown's is a brand of soft drink made by J & R Bottling. It is popular in the New York City region and South Florida, but it can also be found in Jewish delicatessens and upscale supermarkets around the United States and in English-speaking neighborhoods in Israel. Slogans for the products have included "Imported From the Old Neighborhood" and "Taste of the Town."

Dr. Brown's was created in 1869 and was commonly sold in New York delicatessens and by soda salesmen who sold the product from door to door in Jewish neighborhoods. According to former marketing director, Harry Gold, a New York doctor used celery seeds and sugar to invent the soda and celery tonic now known as Cel-Ray, which was advertised as a "pure beverage for the nerves." However, some have speculated that there may never have been a Dr. Brown and that the name may have been only a marketing invention.

In the early 1930s, before Coca-Cola received kosher certification, many Jews drank Cel-Ray soda as well as the other soda flavors that had been created by Dr. Brown's. The cans' current labels were designed by Herb Lubalin. Each of the six Dr. Brown's flavors is packaged with a New York vignette taken from old prints, to emphasize the brand's origins in 1800s New York.

In 2013, J & R Bottling transferred the bottling rights to LA Bottleworks with the bottling of the product then continuing to be at the same facility. As of 2014, Dr. Brown's is produced by PepsiCo in their New York City bottling plant.  The Dr. Brown's brand is owned by the Honickman Beverage Group.

Dr. Brown's varieties include cream soda (regular and diet), black cherry soda (regular and diet), ginger ale, root beer, and Cel-Ray (celery-flavored soda). Former flavors include Cola, Orange, Grape, Tune-Up (Lemon) and Club Soda.

Dr. Brown's soda is typically sold in 12-ounce cans and one-liter plastic bottles, as well as two-liter bottles for the black cherry, cream, and root beer flavors. Dr. Brown's soda is also available in a 6-pack of 12-ounce glass bottles.

See also
Cuisine of New York City

References

1869 introductions
American soft drink brands
Israeli cuisine
Jewish American cuisine
Jews and Judaism in New York City
Jews and Judaism in Florida
Kosher drinks